Hofmeister is a German surname. Notable people with the surname include:

 Franz Hofmeister (1850-1922), Bohemian-German doctor, physiologist, chemist and pharmacologist, early protein scientist
 the Hofmeister series of ion classification he discovered
 Franz-Peter Hofmeister (born 1951,), West German-German athlete
 Joy Hofmeister, Oklahoma State Superintendent
 Lilian Hofmeister (born 1950,), Austrian judge and expert in the field of advancement of women’s rights
 Ludwig Hofmeister (1887–1959), German footballer
 Max Hofmeister (1913 – c. 1940), Austrian soccer player
 Sebastian Hofmeister (1494-1533), Swiss Christian monk and Christian religious reformer
 Wilhelm Hofmeister (1824-1877), German biologist and botanist
 Wilhelm Hofmeister (automobile designer) (1912–1978), German automobile designer, the design chief of BMW
 the Hofmeister kink automobile design feature that he invented
 Willy Hofmeister, German rugby union international player

German-language surnames
Lists of people by surname